Events in 1984 in Japanese television.

Debuts
Uchuu Keiji Shaider, tokusatsu (1984–1985)
Adventures of the Little Koala, anime (1984–1985)
Attacker You!, anime (1984–1985)
Bismark, anime (1984–1985)
Chikkun Takkun, anime (1984)
Sherlock Hound, anime (1984-1985)
Giant Gorg, anime (1984)
Fist of the North Star, anime (1984-1987)
Choudenshi Bioman, tokusatsu (1984–1985)
Mujaki na Kankei, drama (1984)
Super Dimension Cavalry Southern Cross, anime (1984)

Ongoing
Music Fair, music (1964–present)
Mito Kōmon, jidaigeki (1969-2011)
Sazae-san, anime (1969–present)
Cat’s Eye, anime (1983-1985)
Ōoka Echizen, jidaigeki (1970-1999)
FNS Music Festival, music (1974–present)
Panel Quiz Attack 25, game show (1975–present)
Doraemon, anime (1979-2005)
Dr. Slump - Arale-chan, anime (1981-1986)
Urusei Yatsura, anime (1981-1986)

Endings

See also
1984 in anime
List of Japanese television dramas
1984 in Japan
List of Japanese films of 1984

References